The Southern Methodist Church is a conservative Protestant Christian denomination with churches located in the southern part of the United States.  The church maintains headquarters in Orangeburg, South Carolina.

The church was formed in 1940 by conservative members of the former Methodist Episcopal Church, South, which in 1939 had reunited with the Methodist Episcopal Church to form the Methodist Church, nearly 100 years after a split in 1844 that occurred due to divisions over slavery.

In 2017, the Southern Methodist Church had approximately 85 churches and 3,200 members. Over 50% of the churches (47) are located in South Carolina. The denomination describes itself as seeking "to continue the doctrinal heritage of the Methodist Episcopal Church, South and to spread the message of salvation and Biblical holiness that John Wesley preached."

The denomination maintains Southern Methodist College, a four-year Bible college with a Christian liberal arts and ministerial program, in Orangeburg, South Carolina, near the church's headquarters: https://smcollege.edu  The denomination also supports foreign missionaries.  The Woman's Missionary Society (WMS)(https://thesmc.org/womens-missionary-society/), the Epworth League children and youth program, and the Cartwright Men's Fellowship serve as specialized ministry and training efforts within the local churches and on the district and conference levels.

See also

Methodism
Southern Congregational Methodist Church
Methodist Episcopal Church, South
List of Methodist denominations

Notes

External links
https://thesmc.org Southern Methodist Church] website

History of Methodism in the United States
Christian organizations established in 1940
Methodism in South Carolina
Southern
Evangelical denominations in North America
Methodist denominations established in the 20th century
Holiness denominations
Conservatism in the United States
1940 establishments in South Carolina